Jiang Xiaoyu (born 11 June 1989) is a Chinese footballer.

Career statistics

Club

Notes

References

1989 births
Living people
Chinese footballers
Association football midfielders
Chinese Super League players
Chengdu Tiancheng F.C. players